Abraham H. Weiler (December 10, 1908 – January 22, 2002) was an American writer and critic best known for being a film critic and motion picture editor for The New York Times. He also served a term as chairman of the New York Film Critics Association.

Weiler was born in the Russian Empire in 1908 and died in Astoria, Queens at age 93 in 2002.

References

1908 births
2002 deaths
American film critics
The New York Times people
Emigrants from the Russian Empire to the United States